Arminia Bielefeld played the 2002–03 season in the Bundesliga. They finished in 16th place, and were relegated from the Bundesliga for the sixth time in their history.

Review and events

Player details

First team

Reserve team

Transfers

In

Out

References

Arminia Bielefeld seasons
Arminia Bielefeld